The 2015 South Florida baseball team represented the University of South Florida during the 2015 NCAA Division I baseball season. The Bulls played their home games at USF Baseball Stadium as a member of the American Athletic Conference. They were led by head coach Mark Kingston in his first season at South Florida.

Previous season
In 2014, the Bulls finished the season 5th in the American with a record of 27–31, 10–14 in conference play. They qualified for the 2014 American Athletic Conference baseball tournament and were eliminated in pool play. They failed to qualify for the 2014 NCAA Division I baseball tournament.

Personnel

Roster

Coaching staff

Season

February
The Bulls opened their season in Clearwater, Florida, close to their campus in Tampa, for a three-game opening weekend tournament with a pair of nationally-ranked clubs in Cal State Fullerton and  Louisville, along with Alabama State. The Bulls went two for three on the weekend, upsetting Cal State Fullerton in the opening game in a pitching duel between Bulls ace Jimmy Herget, who recorded nine strikeouts, and Titans ace Thomas Eshelman, who recorded ten. The Bulls then fell to Louisville, 3–7, before easily defeating Alabama State 12–4 to finish off the weekend 2–1.

The Bulls hosted #5 Florida in a midweek game on February 18, and the Gators defeated the Bulls 13–3 behind six no-hit innings from Brett Morales. In their weekend series from February 20–22, the Bulls took the series against , winning the first two games handily before settling for an unusual tie in the final game due to a travel curfew for the Seahawks.

In the final week of the month of February, the Bulls played a midweek game against  and fell 2–6, losing their third straight midweek game dating back to 2014. In their weekend series against , the Bulls won two of three games, led by another good start for ace Jimmy Herget.

Schedule

|-
! style="background:#006747;color:white;" | Regular Season
|- 

|- align="center" bgcolor="#bbffbb"
| February 13 || vs. #17 Cal State Fullerton ||  || Bright House Field • Clearwater, FL || W 2–1 || Cavallaro (1–0) || Eshelman (0–1) || Peterson (1) || N/A || 1–0 || –
|- align="center" bgcolor="#ffbbbb"
| February 14 || vs. #12 Louisville ||  || Bright House Field • Clearwater, FL || L 3–7 || Harrington (1–0) || Mulholland (0–1) ||  || N/A || 1–1 || –
|- align="center" bgcolor="#bbffbb"
| February 15 || vs. Alabama State ||  || Bright House Field • Clearwater, FL || W 12–4 || Farley (1–0) || Taylor (0–1) ||  || N/A || 2–1 || –
|- align="center" bgcolor="#ffbbbb"
| February 18 || #5 Florida ||  || USF Baseball Stadium • Tampa, FL || L 3–13 || Morales (1–0) || Peterson (0–1) ||  || 2,059 || 2–2 || –
|- align="center" bgcolor="#bbffbb"
| February 20 ||  ||  || USF Baseball Stadium • Tampa, FL || W 12–1 || Herget (1–0) || Morris (0–1) ||  || 652 || 3–2 || –
|- align="center" bgcolor="#bbffbb"
| February 21 || Wagner ||  || USF Baseball Stadium • Tampa, FL || W 9–2 || Mulholland (1–1) || Adams (0–1) ||  || 796 || 4–2 || –
|- align="center" bgcolor="#ffffbb"
| February 22 || Wagner ||  || USF Baseball Stadium • Tampa, FL || T 4–4 (11) ||  ||  ||  || 637 || 4–2–1 || –
|- align="center" bgcolor="#ffbbbb"
| February 24 ||   ||  || USF Baseball Stadium • Tampa, FL || L 2–6 || Koerner (2–0) || Valdes (0–1) ||  || 678 || 4–3–1 || –
|- align="center" bgcolor="#bbffbb"
| February 27 ||  ||  || USF Baseball Stadium • Tampa, FL || W 2–1 || Herget (2–0) || McGillicuddy (0–3) || Peterson (2) || 661 || 5–3–1 || –
|- align="center" bgcolor="#ffbbbb"
| February 28 || High Point ||  || USF Baseball Stadium • Tampa, FL || L 3–10 || Silber (1–0) || Mulholland (1–2) ||  || 612 || 5–4–1 || –

|- align="center" bgcolor="#bbffbb"
| March 1 || High Point ||  || USF Baseball Stadium • Tampa, FL || W 3–0 || Cavallaro (2–0) || Hoffman (0–2) || Peterson (3) || 623 || 6–4–1 || –
|- align="center" bgcolor="#ffbbbb"
| March 3 || at #22 Florida State ||  || Dick Howser Stadium • Tallahassee, FL || L 1–24 || Carlton (1–0) || Lawson (0–1) ||  || 3,944 || 6–5–1 || –
|- align="center" bgcolor="#ffbbbb"
| March 4 || at #22 Florida State ||  || Dick Howser Stadium • Tallahassee, FL || L 3–7 || Byrd (2–0) || Eveld (0–1) || Folsom (1) || 3,900 || 6–6–1 || –
|- align="center" bgcolor="#bbffbb"
| March 6 ||  ||  || USF Baseball Stadium • Tampa, FL || W 1–0 || Herget (3–0) || Prendergast (1–1) || Peterson (4) || 451 || 7–6–1 || –
|- align="center" bgcolor="#bbffbb"
| March 7 || Seton Hall ||  || USF Baseball Stadium • Tampa, FL || W 7–3 || Mulholland (2–2) || McCarthy (0–1) ||  || 657 || 8–6–1 || –
|- align="center" bgcolor="#bbffbb"
| March 8 || Seton Hall ||  || USF Baseball Stadium • Tampa, FL || W 12–6 || Eveld (1–1) || Cahill (0–2) ||  || 701 || 9–6–1 || –
|- align="center" bgcolor="#bbffbb"
| March 11 || at Bethune-Cookman ||  || Jackie Robinson Ballpark • Daytona Beach, FL || W 1–0 || Valdes (1–1) || Lindsay (0–1) || Peterson (5) || 64 || 10–6–1 || –
|- align="center" bgcolor="#bbffbb"
| March 13 || Florida A&M ||  || USF Baseball Stadium • Tampa, FL || W 10–5 || Herget (4–0) || Ogilvie (0–3) ||  || 657 || 11–6–1 || –
|- align="center" bgcolor="#bbffbb"
| March 14 || Florida A&M ||  || USF Baseball Stadium • Tampa, FL || W 4–1 || Mulholland (3–2) || Jarrell (1–2) || Peterson (6) || 774 || 12–6–1 || –
|- align="center" bgcolor="#bbffbb"
| March 15 || Florida A&M ||  || USF Baseball Stadium • Tampa, FL || W 5–0 || Cavallaro (3–0) || Anderson (0–1) ||  || 712 || 13–6–1 || –
|- align="center" bgcolor="#bbffbb"
| March 17 ||  ||  || USF Baseball Stadium • Tampa, FL || W 5–2 || Valdes (2–1) || Whitlock (0–1) || Peterson (7) || 776 || 14–6–1 || –
|- align="center" bgcolor="#bbffbb"
| March 18 ||  ||  || USF Baseball Stadium • Tampa, FL || W 4–3 || Peterson (1–0) || Dopico (1–2) ||  || 481 || 15–6–1 || –
|- align="center" bgcolor="#ffbbbb"
| March 20 || at #18  ||  || Illinois Field • Champaign, IL || L 1–13 || Duchene (3–1) || Herget (4–1) ||  || 543 || 15–7–1 || –
|- align="center" bgcolor="#ffbbbb"
| March 21 || at #18 Illinois ||  || Illinois Field • Champaign, IL || L 2–5 || Johnson (3–1) || Mulholland (3–3) || Jay (5) || 1,021 || 15–8–1 || –
|- align="center" bgcolor="#bbffbb"
| March 22 || at #18 Illinois ||  || Illinois Field • Champaign, IL || W 8–5 || Peterson (2–1) || Jay (4–1) ||  || 784 || 16–8–1 || –
|- align="center" bgcolor="#bbffbb"
| March 24 || at Florida Gulf Coast ||  || Swanson Stadium • Fort Myers, FL || W 8–7 || Farley (2–0) || Anderson (2–2) ||  || 394 || 17–8–1 || –
|- align="center" bgcolor=""
| March 27 || Cincinnati ||  || USF Baseball Stadium • Tampa, FL ||  ||  ||  ||  ||  ||  ||
|- align="center" bgcolor=""
| March 28 || Cincinnati ||  || USF Baseball Stadium • Tampa, FL ||  ||  ||  ||  ||  ||  ||
|- align="center" bgcolor=""
| March 29 || Cincinnati ||  || USF Baseball Stadium • Tampa, FL ||  ||  ||  ||  ||  ||  ||
|- align="center" bgcolor=""
| March 31 || at Stetson ||  || Melching Field • DeLand, FL ||  ||  ||  ||  ||  ||  ||

|- align="center" bgcolor=""
| April 2 || at Connecticut ||  || J. O. Christian Field • Storrs, CT ||  ||  ||  ||  ||  ||  ||
|- align="center" bgcolor=""
| April 3 || at Connecticut ||  || J. O. Christian Field • Storrs, CT ||  ||  ||  ||  ||  ||  ||
|- align="center" bgcolor=""
| April 4 || at Connecticut ||  || J. O. Christian Field • Storrs, CT ||  ||  ||  ||  ||  ||  ||
|- align="center" bgcolor=""
| April 7 || at FIU ||  || FIU Baseball Stadium • Miami, FL ||  ||  ||  ||  ||  ||  ||
|- align="center" bgcolor=""
| April 10 || East Carolina ||  || USF Baseball Stadium • Tampa, FL ||  ||  ||  ||  ||  ||  ||
|- align="center" bgcolor=""
| April 11 || East Carolina ||  || USF Baseball Stadium • Tampa, FL ||  ||  ||  ||  ||  ||  ||
|- align="center" bgcolor=""
| April 12 || East Carolina ||  || USF Baseball Stadium • Tampa, FL ||  ||  ||  ||  ||  ||  ||
|- align="center" bgcolor=""
| April 14 || Stetson ||  || USF Baseball Stadium • Tampa, FL ||  ||  ||  ||  ||  ||  ||
|- align="center" bgcolor=""
| April 17 || at Memphis ||  || FedExPark • Memphis, TN ||  ||  ||  ||  ||  ||  ||
|- align="center" bgcolor=""
| April 18 || at Memphis ||  || FedExPark • Memphis, TN ||  ||  ||  ||  ||  ||  ||
|- align="center" bgcolor=""
| April 19 || at Memphis ||  || FedExPark • Memphis, TN ||  ||  ||  ||  ||  ||  ||
|- align="center" bgcolor=""
| April 22 || Bethune-Cookman ||  || USF Baseball Stadium • Tampa, FL ||  ||  ||  ||  ||  ||  ||
|- align="center" bgcolor=""
| April 24 || Houston ||  || USF Baseball Stadium • Tampa, FL ||  ||  ||  ||  ||  ||  ||
|- align="center" bgcolor=""
| April 25 || Houston ||  || USF Baseball Stadium • Tampa, FL ||  ||  ||  ||  ||  ||  ||
|- align="center" bgcolor=""
| April 26 || Houston ||  || USF Baseball Stadium • Tampa, FL ||  ||  ||  ||  ||  ||  ||

|- align="center" bgcolor=""
| May 1 || at UCF ||  || Jay Bergman Field • Orlando, FL ||  ||  ||  ||  ||  ||  ||
|- align="center" bgcolor=""
| May 2 || at UCF ||  || Jay Bergman Field • Orlando, FL ||  ||  ||  ||  ||  ||  ||
|- align="center" bgcolor=""
| May 3 || at UCF ||  || Jay Bergman Field • Orlando, FL ||  ||  ||  ||  ||  ||  ||
|- align="center" bgcolor=""
| May 5 || at Florida ||  || Alfred A. McKethan Stadium • Gainesville, FL ||  ||  ||  ||  ||  ||  ||
|- align="center" bgcolor=""
| May 8 || at Tulane ||  || Greer Field • New Orleans, LA ||  ||  ||  ||  ||  ||  ||
|- align="center" bgcolor=""
| May 9 || at Tulane ||  || Greer Field • New Orleans, LA ||  ||  ||  ||  ||  ||  ||
|- align="center" bgcolor=""
| May 10 || at Tulane ||  || Greer Field • New Orleans, LA ||  ||  ||  ||  ||  ||  ||
|- align="center" bgcolor=""
| May 12 || at  ||  || John Sessions Stadium • Jacksonville, FL ||  ||  ||  ||  ||  ||  ||
|- align="center" bgcolor=""
| May 14 || UCF ||  || USF Baseball Stadium • Tampa, FL ||  ||  ||  ||  ||  ||  ||
|- align="center" bgcolor=""
| May 15 || UCF ||  || USF Baseball Stadium • Tampa, FL ||  ||  ||  ||  ||  ||  ||
|- align="center" bgcolor=""
| May 16 || UCF ||  || USF Baseball Stadium • Tampa, FL ||  ||  ||  ||  ||  ||  ||

|-
! style="background:#006747;color:white;" | Post-Season
|-

|- align="center"
| May 20 || TBD ||  || Bright House Field • Clearwater, FL ||  ||  ||  ||  ||  ||  || 
|- align="center"
| May 21 || TBD ||  || Bright House Field • Clearwater, FL ||  ||  ||  ||  ||  ||  || 

|-
| All rankings from Collegiate Baseball.
|-

Awards and honors
Jimmy Herget
 Pre-season AAC Pitcher of the Year
 Pre-season All-AAC

Kyle Teaf
 Pre-season All-AAC

References

South Florida Bulls
South Florida Bulls baseball seasons
South Florida Bulls base
South Florida